Ett or ETT may refer to:

Arts
 Caspar Ett (1788–1847), German composer and organist
 English Touring Theatre

Mathematics
 Euler tour technique, in graph theory
 Extensional type theory, in logic

Medicine
 Endotracheal tube, in respiratory medicine
 Epithelioid trophoblastic tumour, a very rare cancer
 Ergothioneine transporter, a protein and human gene (SLC22A4)
 Exercise Tolerance Test, in cardiology

Military
 Embedded Training Teams in Afghanistan
 EBR ETT, a French armoured personnel carrier

Other uses
 Elementary Teachers of Toronto, a Canadian labour union
 English Toy Terrier, a dog breed
 Etruscan language, once spoken in Italy (ISO 639-3: ett)
 European Transactions on Telecommunications, a scientific journal